Love in Shadow is the third studio album by American post-metal band Sumac. It was released on September 21, 2018 through Thrill Jockey. Like the band's experimental collaboration with Keiji Haino earlier in 2018, much of the album was recorded improvisationally. Love in Shadow will be followed by a tour of the United States in early 2019.

Critical reception

Love in Shadow was met with mostly positive reception. The album received an average score of 78/100 from 6 reviews on Metacritic, indicating "generally favorable reviews". Paul Simpson of AllMusic described the album as "a bracing expression of visceral emotions that refuses to go the easiest, most comforting route, as well as the most focused Sumac album yet". Both Chrostopher R. Weingarten of Rolling Stone and Spyros Stasis of PopMatters wrote that Love in Shadow broke new ground, and Pitchfork's Grayson Haver Currin said that Sumac turned "from good to staggering" on the album. Sputnikmusic called the album "startlingly unique" and "the most dynamic and interesting album that Aaron Turner has ever created", but wrote that some of the new ideas were jarring and out of place.

Accolades

Along with the accolades above, Love in Shadow appeared on several Metal Hammer staff members' top lists and as an honorable mention on The A.V. Club's top metal albums list.

Track listing

Personnel
Credits adapted from Love in Shadow liner notes

Sumac
 Aaron Turner – guitar, vocals, artwork, design, production
 Nick Yacyshyn – drums
 Brian Cook – bass

Additional personnel
 Kurt Ballou – production, engineering, mixing
 Audrey Lowell – assistive engineering
 James Plotkin – mastering
 Faith Coloccia – organ (track 1)

Chart performance

References

2018 albums
Sumac (band) albums
Thrill Jockey albums
Albums produced by Kurt Ballou